Sir George Lindor Brown (9 February 1903, Liverpool – 22 February 1971) was an English physiologist and secretary of the Royal Society, of which he was elected a Fellow in 1946.

He was commonly referred to as Sir Lindor Brown; by his own preference.

He was Waynflete Professor of Physiology at the University of Oxford from 1960 to 1967. He resigned from this post to become Principal of Hertford College.

References

1903 births
1971 deaths
Alumni of the University of Manchester
English physiologists
Academics from Liverpool
Waynflete Professors of Physiology
Fellows of the Royal Society
People educated at Boteler Grammar School
Principals of Hertford College, Oxford
Jodrell Professors of Physiology
The Journal of Physiology editors